The Kama (Çulman) is a  long river in Russia. It is the longest left tributary of the Volga and the largest one in discharge. At their confluence, in fact, the Kama is even larger than the Volga.

Before the advent of railroads, important portages connected the Kama with the basins of the Northern Dvina and the Pechora. In the early 19th-century the Northern Ekaterininsky Canal connected the upper Kama with the Vychegda River (a tributary of the Northern Dvina), but was mostly abandoned after just a few years due to low use.

The Kama featured in the 2013 Russian film The Geographer Drank His Globe Away, in the climactic rapids scene.

Dams and reservoirs
The Kama is dammed at several locations:
At Perm, by the dam of the Kama Hydroelectric Station, forming the Kama Reservoir;
At Chaykovsky, by the dam of the  Votkinsk Hydroelectric Station, forming the Votkinsk Reservoir;
At Naberezhnye Chelny, by the dam of the Nizhnekamsk Hydroelectric Station, forming the Nizhnekamsk Reservoir.

Tributaries

The largest tributaries of the Kama are, from source to mouth:

 Veslyana (left)
 Kosa (right)
 South Keltma (left)
 Vishera (left)
 Yayva (left)
 Inva (right)
 Kosva (left)
 Obva (right)
 Chusovaya (left)
 Tulva (left)
 Siva (right)
 Buy (left)
 Belaya (left)
 Izh (right)
 Ik (left)
 Toyma (right)
 Zay (left)
 Vyatka (right)
 Sheshma (left)
 Myosha (right)

Gallery

References

External links

Naberezhnye Chelny and the Kama River

 
Rivers of Perm Krai
Rivers of Tatarstan
Rivers of Udmurtia